A community of action (CoA), unlike a community of practice (CoP), exists in a situation that is structurally more open, where actors have the possibility of bringing about change.  These more open situations might, for example, correspond to collective design teams in professional environments.

CoAs possess some of the characteristics of communities, such as the development of a common language and mutual learning in the course of action.  However, they also possess some of the characteristics typical of more associative social relationships, such as the "voluntary" nature of association and the importance of "common goals" in directing collective activity.  Some argue that this makes CoAs more "rational" groups than CoPs.

Related to 
 Community of circumstance
 Community of inquiry
 Community of interest
 Community of position
 Community of place
 Community of practice
 Community of purpose

External links
 Communities of action: a cognitive and social approach to the design of CSCW systems
 Socio-Semantic Web applications: towards a methodology based on the Theory of the Communities of Action
 Distributed Design Teams as Communities of Practice

Action